The Marden House is a residence in McLean, Virginia designed by American architect Frank Lloyd Wright. It is located just off Chain Bridge Road and overlooks the Potomac River. Also known as "Fontinalis," it is named after Luis Marden (1913–2003), a writer, photographer, and explorer for National Geographic.  It was designed by Wright in 1952 and was completed in 1959 at a cost of $76,000.

The spot had caught Marden's eye in 1944 when he and his wife and had been fishing along the Potomac. After purchasing a plot of land, Marden continued the correspondence he had maintained with Wright since 1940, asking the architect to design a home for him.  It was not until 1952 that the designs finally came.

After Marden moved to a nursing home in 1998, the house was purchased by Jim Kimsey, co-founder of AOL, in 2000 for $2.5 million.

Sources
 Peter Beers: Luis Marden House 1952
 Annie Gowen, "The Wright Way," Washington Post, August 2005
 "Preservation . . . The Wright Way," Washington Life Magazine, May 2006
 Pictures of Marsden house in Residential Architect, 2008
 Storrer, William Allin. The Frank Lloyd Wright Companion. University Of Chicago Press, 2006,  (S.357)

External links 
 Style - Rear Window - Restoring a House That Frank Lloyd Wright Built - NYTimes.com

Frank Lloyd Wright buildings
Houses completed in 1959
McLean, Virginia
Houses in Fairfax County, Virginia
1959 establishments in Virginia